Redact or Redacted may refer to:

 Redacted (film), a 2007 film
 Redacting, Sanitization (classified information), i.e., the process of removing sensitive information
 Redaction, a form of editing
 Torah redactor